Lakeview Estate is a housing estate in Old Ford, east London designed by Berthold Lubetkin. It was built on a site damaged by bombing in World War II, on Grove Road between Old Ford Road and the Hertford Union Canal. The estate opened in 1958. It overlooks the lake in Victoria Park.

References

Housing estates in the London Borough of Tower Hamlets
Berthold Lubetkin buildings
Modernist architecture in London
Old Ford
1958 establishments in England
Residential buildings completed in 1958